This article lists political parties in Sri Lanka.

Alliances

Parliamentary alliances

Other parliamentary alliances

Defunct/dormant alliances

Parties

Parliamentary registered parties

Other registered parties

Unregistered parties

Defunct/dormant parties

Notes

References
  
 
 

Sri Lanka
 
Political parties
Sri Lanka
Political parties